Jolaibari is one of the 60 Legislative Assembly constituencies of Tripura state in India. It is in South Tripura district and is reserved for candidates belonging to the Scheduled Tribes. It is also part of Tripura East (Lok Sabha constituency).

Members of Legislative Assembly

Election results

2018

See also
List of constituencies of the Tripura Legislative Assembly
 South Tripura district
 Manu Assembly constituency
 Tripura East Lok Sabha constituency

References

South Tripura district
Assembly constituencies of Tripura